Dato' Chua Jui Meng (born 22 October 1943) is a Malaysian politician. He was the Member of Parliament (MP) of Dewan Rakyat for the Bakri constituency in the State of Johor for five terms from 1986 to 2008. He was the country's longest serving Minister of Health, holding that position from 1995 to 2004.

Background
Chua was a student activist in the 1970s. He was president of the Malaysian and Singaporean Law Society in the United Kingdom and Ireland as well as Editor in Chief of the Federation of UK and Ireland Malaysian and Singaporean Student Associations.

He is a lawyer called to the British Bar as a Barrister-at-law at the Inner Temple before entering politics through his participation in the Malaysian Chinese Association (MCA). After 35 years with the party, he quit to join People's Justice Party (PKR) in 2009.

Political career

Malaysian Chinese Association (MCA)
Chua began his political career in 1976 when he became a member of the MCA, a component of the ruling Barisan Nasional (BN) coalition. In the 1986 general election, he was elected as Member of Parliament for Bakri, a seat he hold for five consecutive terms.

His speech in Parliament in 1988 on the "Malaysian Chinese dilemma" as a result of the "deviations and misimplementation" of the New Economic Policy (NEP) sparked the formation of the National Economic Consultative Council (NECC). In 1990 the NECC formulated the new National Development Policy (NDP) to succeed the NEP and it was adopted for a period of 10 years (1991–2000), which Chua credited as key to liberalising the economy, education and culture and turning Chinese voter in favour of Barisan Nasional from the 1990s to 2004.

In 1989, Chua was appointed parliamentary secretary for the Ministry of Health (MOH). He was elected as a vice-president of the MCA in 1990 and became the Deputy Minister of International Trade and Industry following the 1990 general election. During this period, he worked on developing small and medium enterprises and promoting trade with China.

After the 1995 general election, Chua was appointed Minister of Health. During his tenure, Chua led the government's fight against the Coxsackievirus outbreak in 1997, the Nipah virus outbreak in 1999, the Japanese encephalitis outbreak in 2000 and the global SARS epidemic in 2003. The Sultanah Fatimah Specialist Hospital (HPSF) in Muar has gone through a variety of development and vast transformation into a specialist hospital under Chua's ministership in MOH and tenure as local-bred MP for Bakri. Its status was officially converted and renamed from Hospital Muar to Hospital Pakar Sultanah Fatimah on 13 October 2003.

MCA fell into crisis in 2001, when factional infighting between "Teams A" and "B" became public. Chua aligned himself to the Lim Ah Lek-led Team B during the Nanyang Siang Pau takeover crisis. The 2002 party elections were cancelled, and Chua retained his vice presidency under the MCA "peace plan" of 2003, which saw Ong Ka Ting assume the presidency. However, he was dropped from the Cabinet after the 2004 general election as he was not recommended to the prime minister by the new party leader.

In the following year's party elections, Chua challenged Ong Ka Ting for the presidency. He performed above expectations, garnering more than a third of the delegates' votes, but was unable to topple the heavily favoured Ong. He made another long-shot attempt at the presidency in 2008, but lost out to Ong Tee Keat. He did not contest the 2008 general election and 2013 general election as his former seat of Bakri fell to the opposition.

People's Justice Party (PKR)
In July 2009, Chua quit the MCA to join the opposition People's Justice Party (PKR), citing the need to preserve the two-party system that emerged after the 2008 elections. In June 2010, the Sultan of Johor, Sultan Ibrahim Ismail revoked the state awards carrying the titles Dato' conferred to Chua by the previous Sultan. Chua accused BN of instigating the move as payback for joining the opposition. He still retains the Dato' title of other state titles by the Sultans of Selangor and Pahang.

He was appointed PKR's chief in Johor, which is regarded as the BN's stronghold.

In February 2013, an open verbal conflict erupted between Johor DAP chairman Boo Cheng Hau and Chua as a result of accusations from either side of splitting Pakatan Rakyat (PR) in Johor, prompting mediation by both DAP and PKR party central leadership. Reconciliations were finally reached by both parties to switch their traditional seats for Chua to contest in the Segamat meanwhile DAP adviser Lim Kit Siang in the Gelang Patah seat in the upcoming 2013 election. Chua was however defeated in the election by the incumbent Dr. S. Subramaniam, a BN federal minister.

Election results

Honours
 :
 (1989, revoked on 19 June 2010) 
 (1997, revoked on 10 June 2010)
 (1999, revoked on 10 June 2010)
 :
 Grand Knight of the Order of the Crown of Pahang (SIMP) – Dato' Indera (2002)
 :
 Knight Commander of the Order of the Crown of Selangor (DPMS) – Dato' (2003)

See also
Bakri (federal constituency)

References

External links
 Official blog
 

Living people
1943 births
People from Johor
People from Muar
Malaysian people of Teochew descent
20th-century Malaysian lawyers
Malaysian politicians of Chinese descent
Members of the Dewan Rakyat
Government ministers of Malaysia
Health ministers of Malaysia
Former Malaysian Chinese Association politicians
People's Justice Party (Malaysia) politicians
21st-century Malaysian politicians
Knights Commander of the Order of the Crown of Selangor